This is a list of the 314 districts of England ordered by population, according to estimated figures for  from the Office for National Statistics.

The list consists of 188 non-metropolitan districts, 32 London boroughs, 36 metropolitan boroughs, 56 unitary authorities, and two sui generis authorities (the City of London and the Isles of Scilly). North Northamptonshire and West Northamptonshire are new unitary authorities from 1 April 2021.

See also
List of two-tier counties of England by population
List of ceremonial counties of England by population
List of English districts by area
List of English districts and their ethnic composition
List of English districts by population density
List of districts in south east England by population
List of towns and cities in England by population

References

Demographics of England
Districts of England
Districts by population
Local government in England
English districts